Senator Hurley may refer to:

James R. Hurley (born 1932), New Jersey State Senate
Margaret Hurley (1909–2015), Washington State Senate